Thomas Gayle Morris (August 20, 1919 – March 4, 2016) was an American politician.

He was born in the town of Carbon, Eastland County, Texas. Morris moved to New Mexico and served in the United States Navy from November 12, 1937 to March 22, 1944. He then worked as a farmer in Quay County, and graduated from the University of New Mexico in 1948.

Morris served in the New Mexico House of Representatives from 1953 to 1958, and was elected as a Democrat to the United States House of Representatives in 1958. Morris began serving on January 3, 1959, and left office January 3, 1969, after being defeated for re-election.

He was narrowly defeated by Republican businessman Manuel Lujan Jr.

He ran unsuccessfully for the Democratic nomination for the United States Senate in 1972, and then served as a management consultant and vice president for Bank Securities, Inc. As of 2013 he resided in Albuquerque, New Mexico.

Thomas G. Morris donated his Congressional Papers to the New Mexico State University Library in 1973. He died in March 2016 at the age of 96.

References

Sources

Thomas G. Morris Congressional Papers Finding Aid

1919 births
2016 deaths
People from Quay County, New Mexico
People from Eastland County, Texas
Military personnel from Texas
University of New Mexico alumni
Farmers from New Mexico
Democratic Party members of the New Mexico House of Representatives
Democratic Party members of the United States House of Representatives from New Mexico
20th-century American politicians
People from Albuquerque, New Mexico
United States Navy personnel of World War II